Gregg Berger has been featured in various films, television shows, and video games. He is best known for voicing Odie from the Garfield franchise, Hunter the Cheetah and Ripto from the Spyro the Dragon franchise, Eeyore from the Winnie the Pooh franchise, and Grimlock from The Transformers franchise. He has also been featured in a documentary called I Know That Voice. Berger has been featured in rides at amusement parks, being the narrator in the Men in Black: Alien Attack ride at Universal Studios Florida, and voicing Eeyore in The Many Adventures of Winnie the Pooh ride at Magic Kingdom and Disneyland.

Filmography

Anime

Film

Television

Video games

Live-action

Theme parks

References 

Male actor filmographies
American filmographies